Coleg Cymunedol Y Dderwen is a large English-medium comprehensive school serving the Garw and Ogmore valleys. The school was formed as a result of a merger of Ogmore Comprehensive School and Ynysawdre Comprehensive School in 2011. The school initially operated as a split site school, with students being taught on the campus of both of the previous schools, but in 2013 the school moved to its new building located next to the old Ynysawdre site.

The new building, designed by Scott Brownrigg and constructed by Leadbitter won the BREEAM Outstanding award in 2013.

The school was the first in Wales to issue all of its students with an iPad Mini as educational tools, designed to inspire creativity and aid hands on learning.

Estyn has given Coleg Cymunedol Y Dderwen an overall performance rating of Unsatisfactory.

For 2017, Coleg Cymunedol Y Dderwen was placed in the Amber support category by the Welsh Government.

In 2014, Macphallen "Mac" Kuwale, an Information Technology teacher at the school, was arrested for turning his Cardiff home into a cocaine distribution facility.

References

External links 
 School Website
 Edubase

Secondary schools in Bridgend County Borough
Schools in Bridgend